Tang Liangzhi (born 12 June 1960) is a Chinese politician who is the current party branch secretary of the Anhui Provincial Committee of the Chinese People's Political Consultative Conference. He was previously mayor of Chongqing from January 2018 to December 2021, party secretary of Chengdu, the capital of Sichuan Province, and mayor of Wuhan, the capital of Hubei.

Biography
Tang was born in Honghu, Hubei Province. He attended the Huazhong Technology University, where he specialized in solid-state electronics. After graduating in 1983, he was sent to work for a research institute under the Ministry of Post and Telecommunications. In 1985, he returned to Wuhan to become a technician at a local research institute. In 1987, he joined the inaugural staff of the East Lake Development Area in Wuhan. He spent much of the next two decades working in the Wuhan high-tech sector, in charge of innovation and administration. In 2002, he obtained a doctorate in economics, specializing in western economics. 

In June 2007, Tang moved into politics, becoming the mayor of Xiangfan. In February 2008, he was named party chief of Xiangfan. In February 2011, he was named mayor of Wuhan. His advocacy for major construction development during his time as mayor of Wuhan earned him the nickname "Mr. Dig Dig."

In December 2014, Tang left his home province and was named mayor of Chengdu. In July 2016, Tang took over the post of Chengdu party chief from Huang Xinchu.

In April 2017, Tang was named deputy party secretary of Chongqing. He was appointed as mayor of Chongqing in January 2018.

In December 2021, he was appointed party branch secretary of the Anhui Provincial Committee of the Chinese People's Political Consultative Conference.

References

Living people
Political office-holders in Sichuan
1960 births
Mayors of Chongqing
Mayors of Wuhan
Huazhong University of Science and Technology alumni
Delegates to the 11th National People's Congress
Delegates to the 10th National People's Congress
Alternate members of the 19th Central Committee of the Chinese Communist Party